Matic Verdinek (born 13 April 1994) is a Slovenian handball player for RK Gorenje Velenje and the Slovenian national team.

He represented Slovenia at the 2018 European Men's Handball Championship.

References

Slovenian male handball players
Sportspeople from Celje
1994 births
Living people
Mediterranean Games competitors for Slovenia
Competitors at the 2018 Mediterranean Games
21st-century Slovenian people